Jasveer Kaur, also known as Jaswir Kaur, is an Indian television actress and former backup dancer.

Filmography

Films

Television

References

External links
 

Indian television actresses
Living people
Actresses from Mumbai
Place of birth missing (living people)
1968 births